Epischnia beharella is a species of snout moth in the genus Epischnia. It was described by Viette in 1964, and is known from Madagascar and La Réunion.

The larvae feed on Annona reticulata.

References

Moths described in 1964
Phycitini
Moths of Madagascar
Moths of Réunion